Trevor Williams may refer to:

Sports
Trevor Williams (baseball) (born 1992), American baseball player
Trevor C. Williams (born 1965), Canadian basketball player and coach
Trevor Williams (American football) (born 1993), American football player
Trevor Williams (footballer) (fl. 1902–1907), English footballer 
Trevor Williams (rugby player), former player of Cross Keys RFC

Music
Trevor Williams (bassist) (born 1945), British bass guitarist
Trevor Williams (violinist) (1929–2007), British violinist

Other
Sir Trevor Williams, 1st Baronet (1623–1692), Welsh politician, landowner, military commander and rebel
Trevor Williams (bishop) (born 1948), former Bishop of Limerick and Killaloe
Trevor Williams (plant geneticist) (1938–2015), British plant geneticist
Trevor Williams (designer) (1931–2008), British film and television production designer